Henderson Run is a  long 1st order tributary to Pine Creek in Crawford County, Pennsylvania.

Course
Henderson Run rises about 2 miles west of Dotyville, Pennsylvania in Crawford County and then flows south-southeast to Pine Creek about 1 mile northeast of East Titusville, Pennsylvania.

Watershed
Henderson Run drains  of area, receives about 44.9 in/year of precipitation, and has a wetness index of 433.72 and is about 81% forested.

See also
List of rivers of Pennsylvania

References

Additional Maps

Rivers of Pennsylvania
Rivers of Crawford County, Pennsylvania